The 1939 Ormskirk by-election was held on 27 October 1939.  The by-election was held due to the resignation  of the incumbent National Labour MP, Samuel Rosbotham.  It was won by the National Labour candidate Stephen King-Hall.

References

1939 elections in the United Kingdom
1939 in England
1930s in Lancashire
Politics of the Borough of West Lancashire
Ormskirk
By-elections to the Parliament of the United Kingdom in Lancashire constituencies
Unopposed by-elections to the Parliament of the United Kingdom (need citation)